Curt Gowdy State Park is a public recreation area covering  in Albany and Laramie counties in Wyoming, United States. The state park is known for its extensive trail system, fishing reservoirs, and Hynds Lodge, which is listed on the National Register of Historic Places. The park is managed by the Wyoming Division of State Parks and Historic Sites.

History
The park was established in 1971 through a lease agreement with the City of Cheyenne and the Boy Scouts. It was originally called Granite State Park and covered . It was renamed in 1972 in honor of national  sportscaster and outdoorsman Curt Gowdy (1919–2006), a Wyoming native, born in Green River and raised in Cheyenne where his broadcasting career began. He was a two-sport varsity athlete (basketball, tennis) at the University of Wyoming in Laramie.

The park originally included the Crystal and Granite Springs reservoirs. It was expanded in 2005 to include the Upper North Crow Reservoir, the area of Hidden Falls, and the canyon below the dam at Crystal Reservoir. 

In 2006, the park saw initiation of an International Mountain Bicycling Association (IMBA) trail improvement project. The trail system earned the IMBA's "Epic" designation in 2009. In 2009, Wyoming began a program to build additional hiking trails in several Wyoming state parks. Curt Gowdy State Park served as the pilot project for the program, with 32 miles of additional trails. The state required that the newly built trails do not fundamentally alter the landscape of the park. Funding for the trails came from federal and state funds and private donations.

Trail improvements resulted in a substantial increase in visitorship with number of annual visitors to the park increasing from 56,000 in 2006 to 120,000 in 2013. To accommodate the park's newfound popularity, a new state-of-the-art, green-certified, visitor center was opened in 2014.

Geography
Park terrain consists of rolling hills and sharp granite outcroppings in the foothills of the Laramie Mountains. Wildlife that can be found include: kokanee salmon, perch, brown, rainbow and lake trout, white-tailed deer, and mule deer. The park is divided into seven sections centering around three reservoirs: Granite Springs, the largest, Crystal, the smallest, and the isolated North Crow, located northwest of the main park.

Activities and amenities
Other activities include boating, canoeing, water skiing, fishing, camping, rockhounding, and archery.

References

External links

Curt Gowdy State Park Wyoming State Parks, Historic Sites & Trails
Curt Gowdy State Park Brochure and Map Wyoming State Parks, Historic Sites & Trails
Curt Gowdy State Park Trails Brochure and Map Wyoming State Parks, Historic Sites & Trails

State parks of Wyoming
Protected areas of Laramie County, Wyoming
Protected areas of Albany County, Wyoming
Protected areas established in 1971
IUCN Category III
1971 establishments in Wyoming